David A. Keith is an Australian botanist / ecologist who works in the areas of vegetation dynamics, population and ecosystem modelling, and fire. He is currently (September 2020) professor of botany at the University of New South Wales. His work has led to his being a member of the Australian Threatened Species Scientific Committee and the standards committees for the IUCN Red List of Threatened Species and the IUCN Red List of Ecosystems.

He was awarded the Australian Ecology Research Award by the Ecological Society of Australia in 2013. In 2017 he was awarded the Clarke Medal by the Royal Society of New South Wales for distinguished work in the Natural Sciences.

Published names 

 Acacia stellaticeps Kodela, Tindale & D.A.Keith, Nuytsia 13(3): 483 (2001) (2001).
 Acacia wickhamii subsp. parviphyllodinea Tindale, Kodela & D.A.Keith, Fl. Australia 11B: 488 (2001).
 Acacia wickhamii subsp. viscidula (F.Muell.) Tindale, Kodela & D.A.Keith, Fl. Australia 11B: 488 (2001).

Selected publications

Books

Keith, D. A. (2004), Ocean Shores to Desert Dunes: The Native Vegetation of New South Wales and the ACT
Keith, D.A. (1998), Forest Ecosystem Classification and Mapping for the Eden Comprehensive Regional Assessment

Articles

Other

References 

Living people
Year of birth missing (living people)
21st-century Australian botanists